The black helicopter is a symbol of an alleged conspiratorial military takeover of the United States in the American militia movement, and has also been associated with UFOs, especially in the UK, men in black, and similar conspiracies.

Overview
Stories of black helicopters first appeared in the 1970s, and were linked to reports of cattle mutilation. It is possible that the idea originated in Hal Lindsey's book The Late, Great Planet Earth, published in 1970 and popular among conspiracy theorists. Lindsey conjectured that the locust-like creatures referenced in the Book of Revelation in the New Testament were actually helicopters, which John had never seen and thus did not know how to describe.

Jim Keith wrote two books on the subject: Black Helicopters Over America: Strikeforce for the New World Order (1995), and Black Helicopters II: The End Game Strategy (1998).

Media attention to black helicopters increased in February 1995, when first-term Republican northern Idaho Representative Helen Chenoweth charged that armed federal agents were landing black helicopters on Idaho ranchers' property to enforce the Endangered Species Act. "I have never seen them", Chenoweth said in an interview in The New York Times. "But enough people in my district have become concerned that I can't just ignore it. We do have some proof."

The black helicopters conjecture resonates well with the belief held by some in the militia movement that troops from the United Nations might invade the United States.  The John Birch Society originally promoted it, asserting that a United Nations force would soon arrive in black helicopters to bring the US under UN control. A similar theory concerning so-called "phantom helicopters" appeared in the UK in the 1970s.

Documented usage

The following organizations and government agencies are known to operate black and/or unmarked helicopters in the United States for unclassified uses:

U.S. Customs and Border Protection operates a dozen black-and-gold UH-60 Black Hawk helicopters.
 The U.S. Army's 160th Special Operations Aviation Regiment uses helicopters primarily painted black and other US military branches operate helicopters painted in black or dark colors, particularly the Pave Low, which was optimized for long-range stealthy insertion and extraction of personnel, including combat search and rescue. The U.S. Army regularly conducts both exercises and operational missions in American airspace. Some of these exercises have taken place in densely populated cities, including Los Angeles, New York, Detroit, San Francisco, New Orleans,Chicago,  and Washington, D.C. Most operational missions are tasked with narcotics interdiction in the American Southwest and out of Florida and Puerto Rico. By extensive use of IR, radar, GPS and night vision devices, as well as other classified means, they are able to fly in zero visibility conditions with no running lights. Frequent practice results in frequent sightings by concerned members of the public.
 In the early 1970s, Air America (a former dummy corporation airline covertly operated on behalf of the CIA under the cover of a private commercial venture) conducted test flights of two highly modified black Hughes OH-6 Cayuse helicopters at Culver City, California. After the mission assigned to it had been completed, one helicopter was transferred to the ownership of the Pacific Corporation of Washington, D.C. The second helicopter currently flies for the Snohomish County Sheriff's Office in Washington State.
 Many defense contractors and helicopter manufacturers also conduct public flight testing of aircraft and components or fly aircraft in public view to test ranges or other corporate airfields for training or demonstrations. Occasionally, some of these aircraft will be made for military clients and are painted in black or dark colors.
 Many US law enforcement agencies use black helicopters for surveillance, transportation, and patrol. Some of the agencies that use them are Immigration and Customs Enforcement, the U.S. Marshals Service, the Drug Enforcement Administration, and the Federal Bureau of Investigation.

Pejorative term
The term has also been used to ridicule other conspiracy theories or conspiracy theorists:

In 2007, a Slate article on basketball refereeing, said: "In the wake of this scandal, every game will be in question, and not only by fans disposed to seeing black helicopters outside the arena."
In 2013, Vice President Joe Biden had recourse to the term in a speech responding to the National Rifle Association during the White House campaign for background checks on all gun purchasers, saying, "The black helicopter crowd is really upset. It's kind of scary, man."
In 2018, the United States Department of Homeland Security proposed a database to monitor the activities of journalists, bloggers and other “media influencers". In response to concerns, DHS's spokesman said, "Despite what some reporters may suggest, this is nothing more than the standard practice of monitoring current events in the media. Any suggestion otherwise is fit for tin foil hat-wearing, black helicopter conspiracy theorists."
In 2020, Governor of Florida Ron DeSantis, in a public appearance with U.S. Vice President Mike Pence, pushed back on critics of his administration in its handling of the COVID-19 pandemic, saying, "We succeeded, and I think that people just don't want to recognize it, because it challenges their narrative, it challenges their assumption, so they got to try to find a boogeymanmaybe it's that there are black helicopters circling the Department of Health. If you believe that, um, I got a bridge in Brooklyn to sell you."

Fictional representations
 Escape from New York is a 1981 film in which the United States is portrayed as a complete police state by 1997. The United States Police Force uses black helicopters to patrol the border walls of Manhattan island, now a prison penal colony. The USPF is shown using the helicopters to perform extractions, surveillance, and to kill inmates attempting to escape. In the 1996 sequel, Escape from L.A., the USPF helicopters are more futuristic in form and function with folding rotors that retract into the top after a landing.
 Blue Thunder, a film where a police officer is assigned as the test pilot of an advanced, dark colored armed helicopter intended for anti-terrorism duties. He then discovers a conspiracy to stir up riots in urban ghettos as a pretext for declaring a national emergency in order to establish a dictatorship, using such helicopters to subdue the population.
 Airwolf, a television series in which an intelligence agency known only as 'The Firm' uses an advanced dark colored armed helicopter to conduct espionage missions both abroad and within the United States.
 Amerika, a television miniseries in which the Soviet Union has taken over the United States under the pretext of a United Nations peacekeeping mission and uses black painted armed helicopters to intimidate the local population and destroy all resistance to their rule.
 Deus Ex, a game where the protagonist uses a black helicopter as a primary means of transport.
 The X-Files: Fight the Future is a 1998 feature film written by Chris Carter and Frank Spotnitz. Black helicopters feature when they chase the central characters Fox Mulder and Dana Scully who have discovered a storage facility for honey bees which have been genetically engineered to carry an extraterrestrial virus. The unmarked black helicopters also play a key role in the finale episodes of season two and nine of the television series, involving the Cigarette Smoking Man.
 Weird Al Yankovic mentions "black helicopters coming 'cross the border" in his song "Foil" (a parody of Lorde's song "Royals") which starts as an advertisement for aluminum foil and devolves into a conspiracy rant.
 Capricorn One: After astronauts Robert Caulfield and Charles Brubaker escape from a U.S. government facility where they were being forced to fake the titular Mars landing, they are pursued by a pair of menacing black Hughes OH-6 Cayuse helicopters.
 The Secret World: Black helicopters with red-tinted canopies owned by the shadowy Orochi Group appear at multiple points in the game, most notably in the Kingsmouth Town area, which includes a quest called "Black Helicopters".
 Conspiracy Theory: A 1997 film starring Mel Gibson. Jerry Fletcher (Mel Gibson) describes silent black military helicopters to an empty cab.
 Cartman Gets An Anal Probe: In this South Park episode from 1997, being the first, there is a scene when the farmer Bill Denkins tells Officer Barbrady that there have been recent sightings of UFOs and black helicopters. Barbrady laughs at him, but then black helicopters fly behind him. Barbrady thinks the noise of the helicopters was nothing but a pigeon flying.

See also
 Black Volga
 Cattle mutilation
 List of conspiracy theories

References

External links
 

Conspiracy theories in the United States
Government responses to UFOs
Helicopters
Phantom vehicles
UFO-related phenomena
Legendary flying machines